The initials GCFC may refer to the following:
Global Cebu F.C.
Gloucester City F.C.
Guildford City F.C.
The Gold Coast Suns
Gold Coast United Football Club
Generalized context-free grammar or GCFC
Get Coffee From Cafe
See also: Guildford (city) and Gold Coast, Queensland